Alomia is a genus of flowering plants in the family Asteraceae, described as a genus in 1818.

Alomia is endemic to Mexico.

 Species
 Alomia ageratoides Kunth - Mexico
 Alomia alata Hemsl. - Guerrero, Morelos, México State
 Alomia callosa (S.Watson) B.L.Rob. - Jalisco
 Alomia hintonii R.M.King & H.Rob. -  México State
 Alomia stenolepis S.F.Blake - Sonora

References

Eupatorieae
Asteraceae genera
Endemic flora of Mexico